Huevos Rancheros were a Canadian surf rock band from Calgary, Alberta, active from 1990 to 2000. Huevos Rancheros performed an instrumental blend of rockabilly, surf, garage and punk music.

History
Initially consisting of guitarist Brent Cooper, bassist Graham Evans and drummer Richie Ranchero, Huevos Rancheros released the six-song EP Huevosaurus independently in 1990 before releasing the EP Rocket to Nowhere in 1991 on Estrus Records. In its early years the band was sometimes described as a cross between Led Zeppelin and The Ventures.

The band then signed to C/Z Records, which reissued Huevosaurus in 1992 before releasing the band's full-length album Endsville in 1993.

In 1995, the band signed to Mint Records. Around the same time, Evans left the band and was replaced by Tom Kennedy. The band's instrumental rock record Dig In was released that year.

In 1998, their album Get Outta Dodge was nominated for a Juno Award in the Best Alternative Album category.

After touring in Europe with Duotang, in 2000 the band released the album Muerte del Toro. They broke up soon after, although they have performed occasional reunion shows at benefit concerts to raise money for a journalism scholarship named in memory of former Calgary Herald music critic James Muretich. The reunion show lineup has featured Evans rather than Kennedy on bass.

Cooper went on to found The Ramblin' Ambassadors, a three-piece instrumental band.

Band members

Original lineup
Brent J. Cooper - guitar
Graham Evans - bass
Richie Lazarowich - drums, percussion

2nd lineup
Brent J. Cooper - guitar
Tom Kennedy - bass
Richie Lazarowich - drums, percussion

3rd lineup
Brent J. Cooper- guitar
Keith Rose - bass
Richie Lazarowich - drums, percussion

Discography

EPs
Huevosaurus (1990; reissued on C/Z Records in 1992)
Rocket to Nowhere (1991)
The Wedge (Mint Records, 1999)

Albums
Endsville (C/Z Records, 1993)
Dig In! (Mint Records, 1995)
Longo Weekendo Fiesta (Lucky Records, 1995)
Get Outta Dodge (Mint Records, 1996)
Muerte del Toro (Mint Records, 2000)

See also

Music of Canada
Canadian rock
List of Canadian musicians

References

External links
Huevos Rancheros at CBC Music

Musical groups established in 1990
Canadian indie rock groups
Musical groups from Calgary
Rockabilly music groups
Mint Records artists
Canadian instrumental musical groups
1990 establishments in Alberta